Adrian Malcolm Conan Doyle (19 November 19103 June 1970) was the youngest son of Sir Arthur Conan Doyle and his second wife Jean, Lady Doyle or Lady Conan Doyle. He had two siblings, sister Jean Conan Doyle and brother Denis, as well as two half-siblings, sister Mary and brother Kingsley.

Adrian has been depicted as a racing car driver, big-game hunter, explorer, and writer. Biographer Andrew Lycett calls him a "spendthrift playboy" who (with his brother Denis) "used the Conan Doyle estate as a milch-cow".

He married Danish-born Anna Andersen, and was his father's literary executor after his mother died in 1940. He founded the Sir Arthur Conan Doyle Foundation in Switzerland in 1965. On his death, his sister Jean took over as their father's literary executor.

Additional Sherlock Holmes stories
Adrian Conan Doyle produced additional Sherlock Holmes stories, some with the assistance of John Dickson Carr. The basis of his production was to complete those tales referenced in his father's stories, which his father had never written. (Carr had published an "authorized" biography of Sir Arthur in 1949.) These additional Sherlock Holmes tales were written in 1952 and 1953, and a hardcover collection of the stories was published as The Exploits of Sherlock Holmes in 1954. They have been reissued subsequently, while other authors have also written Sherlock Holmes stories based on the same references within the original tales.

Discovery of unpublished Holmes story
On 12 September 1942, the Associated Press announced that an authentic, unpublished Sherlock Holmes story had been found by Adrian Conan Doyle. Supposedly written in his father's uniquely neat handwriting, the story was buried in a chest that contained family documents. (Actually, Jon Lellenberg reported in 1990, the manuscript was not in Sir Arthur's handwriting but typewritten.) Sir Arthur's daughter Jean said she knew the manuscript was not written by her father. Adrian Conan Doyle refused to publish it. A month later, The Baker Street Irregulars wrote a letter to the Saturday Review of Literature, insisting that the story be published.

In the United States, Cosmopolitan magazine obtained it and published it in their August 1948 issue under the uncharacteristic title "The Case of the Man who was Wanted". It was also published in London's
Sunday Dispatch magazine the following January. Sherlock Holmes expert Vincent Starrett doubted that the story was written by the elder Doyle and suggested that Adrian was the author.

In September 1945, a letter was received by Hesketh Pearson, a biographer of Sir Arthur. The letter stated, "My pride is not unduly hurt by your remark that 'The Man who was Wanted' is certainly not up to scratch for the sting is much mitigated by your going on to remark that it carries the authentic trade–mark! This, I feel, is a great compliment to my one and only effort at plagiarism." The letter was written by an architect named Arthur Whitaker who had sent the story to Arthur Conan Doyle in 1911 with a suggestion that they publish it as a joint collaboration. Doyle refused, but sent Whitaker a "cheque for ten guineas" in payment for the story. After seeing it attributed to Sir Arthur in the Sunday Dispatch, Whitaker wrote a letter to Denis Conan Doyle explaining the true authorship. Denis forwarded the letter to his brother Adrian, who became angry, demanded proof, and threatened legal action. Whitaker had retained a carbon copy and the Doyles admitted in 1949, after seeing the carbon copy and listening to people who had read it in 1911, that Whitaker was the author. The story that many people had accepted as the work of Sir Arthur has since been published as "The Adventure of the Sheffield Banker" in the collection The Further Adventures of Sherlock Holmes.

Works about his father
Sir Arthur's widow Jean chose a spiritualist, the Rev. John Lamond, to write an authorised life of him, Arthur Conan Doyle: A Memoir (John Murray, 1931). The memoir emphasised his paranormal interests but was not what readers wanted, so after their mother's death Adrian and Denis grudgingly allowed Hesketh Pearson to write Conan Doyle: His Life and Art (Methuen, 1943). But Pearson's book offended Adrian and Denis by saying that the secret of their father's success was that he was the "common man". Adrian threatened criminal proceedings against Pearson's "fakeography", and wrote an article in protest, and later, a book: The True Conan Doyle (John Murray, 1945). 

According to Lycett, "When the BBC commissioned an anniversary talk from Hesketh Pearson, Adrian announced that if it went ahead it would never broadcast another Sherlock Holmes story. The Corporation caved in."

Arms

Bibliography
 The Exploits of Sherlock Holmes (1954, London, John Murray)
 The True Conan Doyle, (1945, London, John Murray; written about Arthur Conan Doyle, with a preface by Sir Hubert Gough)

Sherlock Holmes stories
These stories were written by Adrian Conan Doyle and John Dickson Carr except as stated. A number (at least six) of the Holmes stories were written by Adrian solely. They were collected in the book, "Exploits of ..."
 "The Adventure of the Seven Clocks"
 "The Adventure of the Gold Hunter"
 "The Adventure of the Wax Gamblers"
 "The Adventure of the Highgate Miracle"
 "The Adventure of the Black Baronet"
 "The Adventure of the Sealed Room"  by Adrian Doyle solely
 "The Adventure of the Foulkes Rath"
 "The Adventure of the Abbas Ruby"
 "The Adventure of the Dark Angels"
 "The Adventure of the Two Women"
 "The Adventure of the Deptford Horror"
 "The Adventure of the Red Widow"

Non-Holmes works
 Heaven Has Claws (1952, London, John Murray)
 Tales of Love and Hate (1960, London, John Murray)
 The Woman Who Slew; Black Hyde; Lady Moresby's Secret; A Tooth for a Tooth; The Red Swallowtail; The Lover of the Coral Glades; The Gunman of Corpus Christi; Jungle Lore; The Pearl of Dying Boys' Reef; Johnny Death
 Lone Dhow (1963, London, Murray)

References

Citations

External links
 The Sir Arthur Conan Doyle Literary Estate, official website of one copyright holder
  Includes "Family Awaits a Message", Adrian on Sir Arthur's promise to communicate

1910 births
1970 deaths
British expatriates in Switzerland
English short story writers
English mystery writers
People from Crowborough
Writers from Geneva
Adrian Conan Doyle
Sherlock Holmes
Place of birth missing
Place of death missing
19th-century British short story writers
Adrian Conan